Telestrations is a party game in which players are prompted to sketch a word listed on a card, then guess what the other players have drawn. The game is produced by USAopoly.

Gameplay 
Each player is given a drawing book and a marker. At the start of each round, every player is given a card with a list of secret words, each with a number between one and six. One player rolls a die to determine which word each player will draw. The players then have sixty seconds to draw their word or phrase on page one of their drawing book.

Once the sixty seconds have passed, the players pass their books to the player on their left. On page two, the players guess what has been drawn on page one of the book that was passed to them. Once all players have written their guesses, they turn their books to page three and again pass their books to the left. Players continue to draw and guess until they have their original books back.

The players then take turns revealing what was drawn and guessed in their books, then award points. Each player awards: 

 One point to the player who drew their favorite sketch in their book
 One point to the player who made their favorite guess in their book
 One point to them-self if the final guess is the same as the secret word

The player with the most points after three rounds wins the game.

Reception 
Gaming website BoardGameGeek named Telestrations "Best Party Game" of 2010.

Video game version 
A video game version of Telestrations has been announced for release exclusively for the Intellivision Amico.

References

External links 
 Telestrations at USAopoly
 Telestrations at BoardGameGeek
Online version of Telestrations

Party games